Hamish & Andy's Gap Year is a Logie Award winning comedy series following Hamish Blake and Andy Lee, a pair of Australian comedians, on their trips to various international locations. The first season saw the boys visiting America for ten episodes and broadcast their show weekly from New York City. In its second season in 2012, the show was titled "Hamish & Andy's Euro Gap Year" and seven episodes were broadcast from The Lord Stanley, a disused pub in East London, England. The third season known as "Hamish and Andy's Gap Year Asia" in 2013 was broadcast from a bar in Bangkok, Thailand, called 'The Raintree'.
The fourth season was known as "Hamish and Andy’s Gap Year South America".

The concept for the show was created when the Nine Network hired comedians Hamish Blake and Andy Lee for two series in two years. They came across the idea of "Gap Year" when they realised they never took a gap year after high school, so they would film their many adventures overseas as it was 'ironic' that they had just received a contract for TV.

The show featured the American band Moon Hooch in 2011.

Segments
A number of regular segments appear throughout the series:
 Safari (Season 1 only): Hamish and Andy show a film about where they last went outside of New York, using a “safari map” hidden underneath their desk to show the exact location. For these adventures, the boys dress in purpose-built safari costumes.
 Hamish VS. Andy: This involves various competitions between Hamish and Andy. The segment also features Ryan Shelton as a correspondent. From season 2 onwards, Ian Danter serves as the segment’s narrator, replacing an unnamed voiceover artist used in the first season.
 Ultimate Wingman: Hamish struggles to find Andy (single) a girlfriend, by acting as his wingman (much to the annoyance of Andy). 
 Cultural Eating: Introduced in season 2, the segment involves one of the boys offering the other an unusual local delicacy. Although it only appeared twice in season 2, it became a regular (appearing in almost every episode) in seasons 3 and 4.
 Interviews (Season 1 only): Hamish and Andy interviewed various celebrities, either in the studio or in hotel rooms. This segment was removed from the DVD release because the people interviewed denied on including them.
 R2-To-Do (Season 1 only): This robot featured on the show provides a list of goals for Hamish and Andy to achieve on their journey.
 100-Second New York Lessond (Season 1 only): Taken by Ryan Shelton where he would take the viewers on various highly-exaggerated tours of different culture and places in New York, each timed to 100 seconds. Hamish and Andy would make cameo appearances in each of the segments.

Ratings

Series Overview 
To date, four seasons of Hamish & Andy's Gap Year have aired.

{| class="wikitable" style="text-align: center;"
|-
! style="padding: 0 8px;" colspan="2" rowspan="2"| Season
! rowspan="2" style="padding:0 8px; width:300px;"| Season Title
! style="padding: 0 8px;" rowspan="2"| Episodes
! style="padding: 0 8px;" rowspan="2"| Base Location
! colspan="2"| Originally aired
! style="padding: 0 8px;" rowspan="2"| DVD release date
|-
! style="padding: 0 8px;"| Season premiere
! style="padding: 0 8px;"| Season finale
|- 
|  style="background:#d1afe9; height:10px;"|
| 1
| Gap Year
| 10
|  Brooklyn
| 
| 
| 
|-
|  style="background:#9ee6a0; height:10px;"|
| 2
| Euro Gap Year
| 7
|  London
| 
| 
| 
|-
|  style="background:#a5ccee; height:10px;"|
| 3
| Gap Year Asia
| 6
|  Bangkok
| 
| 
| 
|-
|  style="background:#dda97e; height:10px;"|
| 4
| Gap Year South America
| 6
|  Buenos Aires
| 1 July 2014
| 
| 
|}

Seasons

Hamish & Andy's Gap Year (2011)

Hamish & Andy's Gap Year USA - "Best Of" Edition (2015)
A new version of Hamish & Andy's Gap Year was released to Stan in 2015 alongside all other Gap Year series, Caravan of Courage specials, Learn India with Hamish & Andy and Hamish & Andy's Reministmas Special. This version is based on the interview-free DVD, but rearranged and with a few segments (mostly 100-Second New York Lessond segments) deleted. This is also the version available on the Hamish & Andy TV YouTube channel, rather than the original.

Part 1 (Special Announcement: Hamish thinks about excluding himself from this version)
DVD Intro
Safari #1 - Bare-Hand Fishing
R2-To-Do - 3-Wheeled Tough Mobile + Timeslot Tattoo
Audience’s “Reaction” to Week 1
Safari #2 - Roller Derby
R2-To-Do - Hillary Clinton Owes Us BBQ
100 Second New York Lessond - Food
Ultimate Wingman
Street Golf With Tiger Hood (preceded by "Week Three" title card from the DVD)
Part 2 (Special Announcement: Andy points out that all the “dumb bits”, such as a clip of Hamish eating a massive burger are still included in this version)
Making Your NY Dreams Come True
Safari #3 - LARPing
Hillary Clinton BBQ Update - Voice Analyzer 
100 Second New York Lessond - Nightlife
Ultimate Baby Wingman
3-Wheeled Tough Mobile Update
Part 3 (Special Announcement: Hamish mentions a Brad Pitt appearance, which according to Andy didn’t happen)
Safari #4 - Chateau Poochie
100 Second New York Lessond - Broadway
Hillary Clinton BBQ Update - Jack in Hillary’s Hometown
Jack The Butcher Watches The 3-Wheeled Tough Mobile
Hamish Enters Mr. NY State Bodybuilding Comp
Fun With Glitter Cannons
Safari #5 - Lowriders
Hamish vs. Andy - Bin Lid Racing
Part 4 (Special Announcement: Hamish mentions that they almost put the interviews in, but were worried about celebrity party invitations)
Ultimate Gameshow Wingman
Hamish vs. Andy - Mates Racing
Safari #6 - Western Reenactment Town
Asylum Productions - Home Of The Mockbuster
Safari #7 - Combine Harvester Demolition Derby
R2-To-Do - The Magic Castle
Part 5 (Special Announcement: Hamish mentions that, unlike the celebrities, the regular guest stars get what they deserve)
NASA
Hillary Clinton BBQ Update - Kim Beazley Visit
Magical Johnston presents Street Magic
Safari #8 - Private Investigator Jay J. Armes
Hamish vs. Andy - Stranger Racing
Ultimate Magic Wingman
Safari #9 - Hollerin
Part 6 (Special Announcement: Hamish claims that they removed the interviews cause the celebrities said “you can’t on-sell them”)
Free Plastic Giveaway
Streetball in The Cage with Allan Houston
Hillary Clinton BBQ Update - Ruddy To The Rescue
Magic Castle - Hamish Meets His Mentor, Doug
Hamish vs. Andy - Subway Rodeo
100 Second New York Lessond - Art
Magic Castle  - The Audition
Hamish vs. Andy - Sleep Racing
One Last Drive In The 3 Wheeled Tough Mobile
Ultimate Last Ditch Wingman

Hamish & Andy's Euro Gap Year (2012)

The shows were broadcast from the disused Lord Stanley pub in East London (Sandringham Road, Dalston E8).

This season was also the only one broadcast in the UK on ITV4. Euro Gap Year and Gap Year Asia were rebroadcast in Australia throughout December 2020, due to Hamish and Andy not working on a new TV program that year.

Hamish & Andy's Gap Year Asia (2013)

The shows were broadcast from a bar in Bangkok, Thailand, called 'The Raintree'.

Hamish & Andy's Gap Year South America (2014)

The shows were broadcast from Buenos Aires, Argentina. They also decided to include all of Latin America, rather than just South America, so they could go to Mexico and Central America.

Awards and nominations
Hamish & Andy have won 5 Logie Awards from 16 nominations for their work on Hamish & Andy's Gap Year.

References

External links
 
 Hamish and Andy

2011 Australian television series debuts
2014 Australian television series endings
Australian comedy television series
English-language television shows
Nine Network original programming
Hamish & Andy